Wild Honey is the thirteenth studio album by American rock band the Beach Boys, released December 18, 1967 on Capitol Records. It was the group's first foray into soul music and was heavily influenced by the R&B of artists such as Stevie Wonder. The album was the band's worst-selling at that point, charting at number 24 in the US. Lead single "Wild Honey" peaked at number 31, while its follow-up "Darlin" reached number 19. In the UK, the album peaked at number seven.

The album's sessions began immediately after the recording of Lei'd in Hawaii, a failed live album, and the release of Smiley Smile, their previous LP. Like Smiley Smile, Wild Honeys core instrumental combo consists of organ, honky-tonk piano, and electric bass. The Beach Boys were inspired to regroup as a self-contained rock band, partly in response to critical assertions that they were "ball-less choir boys". They also purposely distanced themselves from the prevailing rock trends of the time, which had been typified by psychedelia and high-scale recording or thematic conceits.

It was the second album to credit "the Beach Boys" as producer instead of Brian Wilson, who gradually withdrew from the band following the difficult sessions for the aborted Smile project. At his request, bandmate Carl Wilson began contributing more to the recording process, a trend that continued on subsequent albums. Mike Love also returned as Brian's main songwriting collaborator for the first time since Summer Days (And Summer Nights!!) (1965). It was the last Beach Boys album to feature Brian as a primary composer until The Beach Boys Love You (1977).

Wild Honey presaged a back-to-basics approach that was subsequently adopted by the Beach Boys' contemporaries, including Bob Dylan and the Beatles, and it is credited with pioneering the DIY pop genre. Most critics initially disregarded the record, but after the mid–1970s, a greater appreciation formed around its simplicity and charm. In 1979, the track "Here Comes the Night" was redone by the group as a disco single. In 2020, Wild Honey was ranked number 410 on Rolling Stones list of the greatest albums of all time. A remixed and expanded edition, titled 1967 – Sunshine Tomorrow, was released in 2017.

Background

The Beach Boys' previous LP Smiley Smile, released in September 1967, peaked at number 41 on US Billboard charts for what was their worst performing album to date. A controversy involving whether the band was to be taken as a serious rock group had critics and fans divided, as journalist Gene Sculatti wrote at the time, "the California sextet is simultaneously hailed as genius incarnate and derided as the archetypical pop music copouts." The unfinished album that Smiley Smile came to replace, Smile, had acquired considerable press, and Capitol Records was still interested in putting the album out. In July 1967, an internal memo circulated around Capitol Records that discussed imminent plans to follow up Smiley Smile with a 10-track version of the original Smile, but this never came to fruition.

Instead, the group traveled to Honolulu and attempted to record a live album, titled Lei'd in Hawaii. There, Wilson intimated to a reporter that he enjoyed the contemporary "pop scene" and acknowledged that, even though "the Beach Boys are squares", he did not feel personally hurt by such a reputation, citing the band's past successes and the enjoyment they get from recording. Upon their return to Los Angeles, in September, the group decided that the recordings were not suitable for release and attempted to redo the project as a live-in-the-studio album. After this, the band recorded the material that formed Wild Honey.

The image on the front of the Wild Honey sleeve is a small section of an elaborate stained-glass window that adorned Brian's home in Bel Air. For the liner notes, friend Arnie Geller and the Wilsons' cousin Steve Korthoff wrote: "Honey, of the wild variety, on a shelf in Brian's kitchen, was not only an aide to all of the Beach Boys' health but the source of inspiration for the record, Wild Honey [...] We think this is a great album. We love to listen to it. We might just be biased because we work for the Beach Boys. Please see what you think." Singer Danny Hutton remembered: "The vibe was still great. He'd [Brian] have me over and he'd suddenly say: 'I've got this idea, man!' Then he'd point to a jar of wild honey. 'That's it! That's what the album's gonna be called!' And the other guys were thrilled." Alternatively, Mike Love said he originated the title after finding a jar of honey in Wilson's cupboard.

Two days after the release of Smiley Smile, Carl Wilson produced some recordings for the songwriter Stephen Kalinich, who later became a collaborator for the group, and the songwriter's partner Mark Buckingham. All of the tracks remain unreleased. In October, Murry Wilson, the band's original manager, made his recording debut with the album The Many Moods of Murry Wilson, with one track composed by Al Jardine and produced by an uncredited Brian.

Style and production

Wild Honey is a soul album that mixes pop and R&B styles. According to Love, the band made a conscious decision to be "completely out of the mainstream for what was going on at that time, which was all hard rock/psychedelic music. [The album] just didn’t have anything to do with what was going on." Unlike the band's previous R&B outings — which typically consisted of Chuck Berry-derived riffs — most of Wild Honey drew on the emotive soul music associated with the Motown and Stax Records labels. Edwin Faust from Stylus Magazine wrote that its music focuses "simply on catchy hooks, snappy melodies and a straight-up boogie-woogie feel". Lenny Kaye, writing for Wondering Sound, felt that its "R&B leanings" may be attributed to Mike Love and Carl Wilson's vocal roles on the album. Carl said that his R&B side had "always wanted to come out. I have this massive collection of R&B records. When we were doing Pet Sounds, I'd go home and put on my Stax and Aretha stuff. It's always been a big part of my life."

Recorded mostly at their private studio – located in Brian's home – the album may be retrospectively viewed as the second installment in a consecutive series of lo-fi Beach Boys albums. According to Brian, "People expected me to come up with great orchestral stuff all the time and it became a burden. [...] we decided to make a rhythm'n'blues record. We consciously made a simpler album. It was just a little R'n'B and soul. It certainly wasn't like a regular Beach Boys record." By the time of the album's recording, Brian was tired of producing the Beach Boys after having done it for several years, and so he requested that brother Carl contribute more to the process. Brian stated that his brother "really got into [...] the production side of things" starting with Wild Honey.

The resulting album was partly a response to critical assertions that the group were "ball-less choir boys". Music theorist Daniel Harrison described Wild Honey as a self-conscious attempt by the Beach Boys to "regroup" themselves as a rock band in opposition to their more orchestral affairs of the past. Bruce Johnston recalled: "we wanted to be a band again. The whole [Smile] thing had wiped everyone out, and we wanted to play together again." The last time the Beach Boys had an album where they essentially played as a self-contained band was 1964's Shut Down Volume 2. Only five tracks were recorded with assistance from session musicians. Some sessions were held at Wally Heider Recording in Los Angeles to accommodate the musicians with a larger recording space for overdubs.

The album differs in many ways from previous Beach Boys records: it contains very little group singing compared to previous albums, and mainly features Brian singing at his piano. The recording sessions lasted only several weeks, compared to the several months required for "Good Vibrations" (1966).  Harrison say that its "simple songs" lacked the "enigmatic weirdness" and "virtuosic mesmerizers" present in Smiley Smile, but featured the same production approach and similar core instrumental combo of organ, honky-tonk piano, and electric bass. The piano was slightly detuned, which Brian said made it "more like a twelve-string guitar, to get a more mellow sound. [...] I loved what it did to the sound of the record." Musicologist Christian Matijas-Mecca noted that "while the album's sparse production aesthetics and stripped-down sonic palette are deceiving, the album is arranged with an attention to detail and tonal clarity." Wild Honey was the last Beach Boys album to be mixed in mono.

Songs

Side one
"Wild Honey" was co-written by Mike Love from the perspective of Stevie Wonder singing it. He felt that the album title was suggestive of both edible honey and "honey" as a term of endearment, Session musician Paul Tanner was recruited to play his Electro-Theremin on the track. "Aren't You Glad" is described by Rolling Stone magazine as a "Lovin' Spoonful type song with the Beach Boys touch", while magazine editor Gene Sculatti said it "achieves a Miracles style smoothness via a Bobby Goldsboro-type song". "I Was Made to Love Her" was originally recorded by Wonder, who had a number 2 hit with the song in July 1967. "Country Air" was stated by Brian to be his "favorite cut on the record." "A Thing or Two" is identified by Christian Matijas-Mecca as a "sibling" to Smiley Smiles "Gettin' Hungry", and that the vocal riff would be reprised in the group's 1968 single "Do It Again".

Side two

"Darlin" was one of the album's more developed productions, and was reworked from the earlier Brian Wilson/Mike Love composition "Thinkin' 'Bout You Baby". Initially, Brian had planned to give this song (along with "Time to Get Alone") to Three Dog Night, then called "Redwood", before Carl and Love insisted that Brian focus his attention on producing work for the Beach Boys. Redwood's version of the song was left unreleased until the 1993 compilation Celebrate: The Three Dog Night Story. "I'd Love Just Once to See You" prefigured the writing style that Brian would later explore in the next studio album Friends.

"Let the Wind Blow" was the first composition recorded by the group that is in  time from beginning to end. "How She Boogaloed It" was the first original Beach Boys song (excluding instrumentals and cover versions) not to feature contributions from Brian. "Mama Says" is a chant that originated from an unreleased incarnation of the composition "Vegetables". It was the first time a track with thematic links to Smile was used to close a later Beach Boys album, the others being 20/20 (1969) and Surf's Up (1971).  Inexplicably, when the alternate "Mama Says" version of "Vegetables" was released, Van Dyke Parks’ songwriting credit was not honored, and instead Love was listed as the song's only co-writer.

Brian is credited as composer or co-composer for 9 of 11 tracks, compared to Smiley Smile in which he held a songwriting credit for every track. This would be the last Beach Boys album to feature Brian as a primary composer until The Beach Boys Love You (1977).

Leftover
Outtakes from the Wild Honey sessions include the originals "Can't Wait Too Long", "Time to Get Alone", "Cool, Cool Water", "Honey Get Home", and "Lonely Days". A solo recording of Brian performing the Smile song "Surf's Up" was lost and rediscovered several decades later at the end of the multi-track reel for "Country Air". Archivist Mark Linett stated: "No explanation for why he did that and it was never taken any farther. Although I don’t think the intention was to take it any farther because it's just him singing live and playing piano." The band also recorded cover versions of the Box Tops hit "The Letter" (1967), Clint Ballard Jr.'s "The Game of Love" (1965), and the Beatles' "With a Little Help from My Friends" (1967), as well as Johnston's demo for "Bluebirds over the Mountain". The New York Observers Ron Hart said that the significance of the Beach Boys covering "The Letter" as sung by Alex Chilton is "simply beyond comprehension [...] for that special kind of music nerd."

On October 13, 1967, Capitol announced that the Beach Boys' next release would be Wild Honey and offered its track listing, even though some of the songs had yet to be recorded at that point. Among its differences, "How She Boogalooed It", "Country Air", and "Mama Says" were not included, while "Cool, Cool Water", "Game of Love", "The Letter" (live version from Hawaii), and "Lonely Days" were. "Honey Get Home" was also listed, but crossed out. "The Letter" was to serve as a teaser for the forthcoming live album before the plans for the record were dropped.

Release 

Lead single "Wild Honey" was issued on October 23, 1967, with a B-side taken from Smiley Smile, "Wind Chimes". The single peaked at number 31 in the US and number 20 in the UK. From November 17 to 26, the touring group embarked on their fifth annual Thanksgiving tour of the US, with set lists that included four songs from the upcoming album: "Wild Honey", "Darlin, "Country Air", and "How She Boogalooed It". Keyboardist Daryl Dragon and bassist Ron Brown supported the band on stage. On December 15, the band performed their only studio-televised live performance of the year at a UNICEF Variety Gala in Paris, for a program titled Gala Variety from Paris, which also featured several other celebrities, including Maharishi Mahesh Yogi.

Wild Honey was issued in the US on December 18, accompanied by the single "Darlin (backed with "Here Today" from Pet Sounds). It was released in competition with the Beatles' Magical Mystery Tour and the Rolling Stones' Their Satanic Majesties Request, and contrasted the psychedelic music that occupied the record charts. Wild Honey became the Beach Boys' lowest-selling album at that point and remained on the charts for only 15 weeks. "Darlin peaked at number 24 in the US, as did Wild Honey. When the single was reissued in January with the B-side "Country Air", it peaked at number 11. In March, Wild Honey was released in the UK, where it peaked at number 7.

Critical reception

Contemporary

Like Smiley Smile, Wild Honey was viewed by contemporary critics as an inconsequential work, and it alienated audiences whose expectations had been raised by Smile. The group remained effectively blacklisted by the music press, to the extent that reviews of the group's records were either withheld from publication or published long after the release dates.  Writing in his 1969 book Outlaw Blues, Paul Williams summarized that Wild Honey was "a work of joy [...] new and fresh and raw and beautiful", and said that while the album's boogie woogie piano riffs were, "in their own way, as inventive as Brian’s more textured records [...] we expected more (from Brian) than we would expect from any other composer alive, because the tracks we'd heard from Smile were just that good. Smiley Smile was [...] a confusion [...] and Wild Honey is just another Beach Boys record."

Rolling Stone reviewed that the Beach Boys regained their better judgement after the "disaster" of Smiley Smile, although their use of "pre-existing ideas and idioms" on Wild Honey is less satisfactory and original than their earlier work: "It's kind of amusing that the Beach Boys are suddenly re-discovering rhythm and blues five years after the Beatles and Stones had brought it all back home". Jazz & Pops Gene Sculatti wrote: "[the Beach Boys] have the audacity to fool around with r&b, a territory indeed alien to them. Surprisingly, Wild Honey works well. It isn't the least bit pretentious, it's honest, and convincing." In a column for Esquire, Robert Christgau wrote that the album "epitomizes Brian Wilson", including the song "I'd Love Just Once to See You", which "expresses perfectly his quiet, thoughtful, sentimental artistic personality." Billboard welcomed the band's return to form after the "avant-garde" Smiley Smile, but was critical of "How She Boogalooed It" as "far below the group's quality" and predicted that "I'd Love Just Once to See You" would not receive airplay.

Disc & Music Echo awarded the album "LP of the Month" and wrote that it was the band's best since Pet Sounds. The magazine concluded that "Others who, like us, felt Brian Wilson was becoming bogged down in his complex arrangements can relax and listen to the most refreshing sounds for many months." In a 1968 Crawdaddy! article, David Anderle reported that the Doors' Jim Morrison considered Brian Wilson "his favorite musician" and Wild Honey "one of his favorite albums. [...] he really got into it."

Retrospective

Like Smiley Smile, Wild Honey was later reevaluated by fans and critics who highlighted the record for its simplicity and charm, particularly after the LP was reissued by Warner Bros. in 1974. In his 1971 review of Surf's Up, Rolling Stones Arthur Schmidt referred to Wild Honey as "a masterpiece", "the most underrated" of the band's "post-surfer LPs", and "the last time they truly rocked their asses off, one cut after another." In a 1976 retrospective guide to 1967 for The Village Voice, Christgau felt Wild Honey is "so slight" but "perfect and full of pleasure". He argued that, "almost without a bad second", the album conveys "the troubled innocence of the Beach Boys through a time of attractive but perilous psychedelic sturm und drang. Its method is whimsy, candor, and carefully modulated amateurishness, all of which comes through as humor."

Critic Geoffrey Himes called the record "10 wonderful celebrations of everyday life and a terrific Stevie Wonder cover. Wonder, though, never sang odes to clean air and refreshing wind or made boyish jokes about seeing a naked woman or brushing one's teeth."  Record producer Tony Visconti listed Wild Honey as one of his 13 favorite albums and said that "I still refer to this record as a benchmark in the same way that I do Revolver."  In 2020, Rolling Stone ranked the record at number 410 on its list of "The 500 Greatest Albums of All Time". It was also ranked second on Rolling Stones 2012 list of the "Coolest Summer Albums of All Time" list, with the editors praising the record's "hedonistic rock & roll spirit", "humor" and "pensive depth".

Less favorably, Richie Unterberger wrote in his review for AllMusic that, apart from "Darlin, "Here Comes the Night" and the title track, most of Wild Honey was "inessential". He found the music "often quite pleasant, for the great harmonies if nothing else, but the material and arrangements were quite simply thinner than they had been for a long time." Sommer wrote that the album's original mono mix suffers from being "flat and peculiar". In the lyrics to the Beta Band's 1999 song "Round the Bend", Wild Honey is hailed for its "funny little love songs" although considered "probably not as good as something like Pet Sounds".

In a negative review, Pitchfork critic Spencer Owen said only "one or two" songs succeed and the majority of Wild Honey is "not pretty" because of its R&B vein as "interpreted by white surfer boys", including "a Stevie Wonder cover sung with as much faux-soul as Carl Wilson could have possibly mustered". Writing in his Encyclopedia of Popular Music, Colin Larkin pairs the album with the "scrappy" Smiley Smile as two "hastily released" works that show how the Beach Boys' music had "lost its cohesiveness", with Brian Wilson's reduced involvement. Noel Gallagher, who considers the Beach Boys to be "the most vastly overrated band in the history of popular culture", named "How She Boogalooed It" among the group's only "six good tunes".

Influence and legacy

Back-to-basics trend and DIY music

In the wake of Wild Honey, numerous contemporaries of the Beach Boys adopted a similar back-to-basics approach, including Bob Dylan (John Wesley Harding), the Band (Music from Big Pink), the Beatles (The Beatles), and the Rolling Stones (Beggars Banquet). Uncuts David Cavanaugh remarked that despite the poor critical response afforded to the album at the time of its release, Wild Honey heralded rock trends of the late 1960s and effectively pioneered "a post-psychedelic music while the Summer of Love was still in full swing. And wouldn’t you know it, The Beatles' 'Lady Madonna' would get the credit." Author Mike Segretto echoed, "Ten days before Dylan got all the credit for popping the psychedelic balloon with John Wesley Harding, the Beach Boys had done it first with Wild Honey."

Similarly, music journalist Tim Sommer characterized the album as boldly subverting "rock's expansion into pompous avenues of volume, psychedelia and lyrical pretension" and called it a precursor to albums such as the Kinks' Village Green Preservation Society and the Byrds' The Notorious Byrd Brothers (both 1968). Editors at Rolling Stone credited the LP with starting "the idea of DIY pop".

1967 – Sunshine Tomorrow
In 2017, a complete stereo mix of Wild Honey was released for the first time on the rarities compilation 1967 – Sunshine Tomorrow. The set also includes numerous session highlights, alternate takes, and live renditions of Wild Honey tracks in addition to other unreleased material recorded during the Smiley Smile and Lei'd in Hawaii era. Several months later, the compilation was followed with two more digital-exclusive releases: 1967 – Sunshine Tomorrow 2: The Studio Sessions and 1967 – Live Sunshine. They include more than 100 tracks that were left off the first compilation.

Track listing

Personnel

Credits per Craig Slowinski.

The Beach Boys
 Al Jardine – vocals, rhythm guitar on "I'd Love Just Once To See You"
 Bruce Johnston – vocals, organ on "Wild Honey" and "How She Boogalooed It", bass on "Wild Honey"
 Mike Love – vocals
 Brian Wilson – vocals, piano, organ, percussion, bass on "A Thing Or Two" and "I'd Love Just Once to See You"
 Carl Wilson – vocals; lead and rhythm guitars; bass on "Aren't You Glad", "Country Air", "I'd Love Just Once to See You", and "Let the Wind Blow"; tambourine on "Wild Honey"; drums on "Darlin (inaudible)
 Dennis Wilson – vocals, drums, bongos

Additional musicians
 Hal Blaine – drums on "Darlin
 Ron Brown – bass on "Darlin, "I Was Made to Love Her", and "Here Comes the Night"
 Paul Tanner – Electro-Theremin on "Wild Honey"

Production and technical staff
 The Beach Boys – producers
 Jim Lockert – engineer
 Bill Halverson – second engineer
 Stephen Desper – engineer on "Mama Says" (uncredited)

In his 2004 book The Beach Boys: A Definitive Diary, Keith Badman was unable to determine who played strings and horns on "Darlin.

Charts

Notes

References

Bibliography

External links 
 
 
 

The Beach Boys albums
Capitol Records albums
1967 albums
Albums produced by the Beach Boys
Albums recorded at Wally Heider Studios
Lo-fi music albums
Pop rock albums by American artists
Soul albums by American artists
Albums recorded in a home studio